Raymundo Rodríguez González (15 April 1905 - date of death unknown), nicknamed Mapache, was a Mexican footballer who played as a midfielder.

Career
Rodríguez participated in the 1930 FIFA World Cup. He played only in one game in the tournament, a match against Argentina. During this period, his club was Marte FC.

Sources 
 A.Gowarzewski : "FUJI Football Encyclopedia. World Cup FIFA*part I*Biographical Notes - Heroes of Mundials" ; GiA Katowice 1993
 Match report

1905 births
Year of death missing
Mexican footballers
Mexico international footballers
1930 FIFA World Cup players
Association football midfielders